Jadovnik (Serbian Cyrillic: Јадовник) is a mountain in southwestern Serbia, on the western edge of Pešter plateau, between towns of Prijepolje and Sjenica. Its highest peak Katunić has an elevation of 1,734 meters above sea level.

References

Mountains of Serbia